This is a list of wars involving the Plurinational State of Bolivia and its predecessor states from 1809 to the present.

See also 
 Bolivian War of Independence

References

 
Bolivia
Wars